Foam concrete, also known as Lightweight Cellular Concrete (LCC), Low Density Cellular Concrete (LDCC), and other terms is defined as a cement-based slurry, with a minimum of 20% (per volume) foam entrained into the plastic mortar. As mostly no coarse aggregate is used for production of foam concrete the correct term would be called mortar instead of concrete; it may be called "foamed cement" as well. The density of foam concrete usually varies from 400 kg/m to 1600 kg/m. The density is normally controlled by substituting fully or part of the fine aggregate with foam.

Terminology
It is also called foamed concrete, foamcrete, cellular lightweight concrete or reduced density concrete.

History

The history of foam concrete dates back to the early 1920s and the production of autoclaved aerated concrete, which was used mainly as insulation. A detailed study concerning the composition, physical properties and production of foamed concrete was first carried out in the 1950s and 60s. Following this research, new admixtures were developed in the late 1970s and early 80s, which led to the commercial use of foamed concrete in construction projects. Initially, it was used in the Netherlands for filling voids and for ground stabilisation. Further research carried out in the Netherlands helped bring about the more widespread use of foam concrete as a building material. More recently, foam concrete is being made with a continuous foam generator. The foam is produced by agitating a foaming agent with compressed air to make "aircrete" or "foamcrete". This material is fireproof, insect proof, and waterproof. It offers significant thermal and acoustic insulation and can be cut, carved, drilled and shaped with wood-working tools. This construction material can be used to make foundations, subfloors, building blocks, walls, domes, or even arches that can be reinforced with a construction fabric.

Manufacturing
Foamed concrete typically consists of a slurry of cement or fly ash and sand and water, although some suppliers recommend pure cement and water with the foaming agent for very lightweight mixes. This slurry is further mixed with a synthetic aerated foam in a concrete mixing plant. The foam is created using a foaming agent, mixed with water and air from a generator. The foaming agent must be able to produce air bubbles with a high level of stability, resistant to the physical and chemical processes of mixing, placing and hardening.

Foamed concrete mixture may be poured or pumped into moulds, or directly into structural elements. The foam enables the slurry to flow freely due to the thixotropic behaviour of the foam bubbles, allowing it to be easily poured into the chosen form or mould. The viscous material requires up to 24 hours to solidify (or as little as two hours if steam cured with temperatures up to 70 °C to accelerate the process.), depending on variables including ambient temperature and humidity. Once solidified, the formed product may be released from its mold.
A new application in foam concrete manufacturing is to cut large concrete cakes into blocks of different sizes by a cutting machine using special steel wires. The cutting action takes place before the concrete has fully cured.

Properties

Foam concrete is a versatile building material with a simple production method that is relatively inexpensive compared to autoclave aerated concrete. Foam concrete compounds utilising fly ash in the slurry mix is cheaper still, and has less environmental impact. Foam concrete is produced in a variety of densities from 200 kg/m to 1,600 kg/m depending on the application. Lighter density products may be cut into different sizes. While the product is considered a form of concrete (with air bubbles replacing aggregate), its high thermal and acoustical insulating qualities make it a very different application than conventional concrete.

Advantages
 In terms of thermal conductivity, foam concrete is not inferior to wood – a 40 cm wall is able to withstand -30° frost.
 Foam concrete withstands one-sided exposure to fire for at least 3 hours, on average – 5 hours.

Applications

Foamed concrete can be produced with dry densities of 400 to 1600 kg/m (25 lb/ft to 100 lb/ft), with 7-day strengths of approximately 1 to 10 N/mm (145 to 1450 psi) respectively. Foam concrete is fire resistant, and its thermal and acoustical insulation properties make it ideal for a wide range of purposes, from insulating floors and roofs, to void filling. It is also particularly useful for trench reinstatement.

A few of the applications of foam concrete are:

 bridge approaches / embankments
 pipeline abandonment / annular fill
 trench backfill
 precast blocks
 precast wall elements / panels
 cast-in-situ / cast-in-place walls
 insulating compensation laying
 insulation floor screeds
 insulation roof screeds
 sunken portion filling
 trench reinstatement
 sub-base in highways
 filling of hollow blocks
 prefabricated insulation boards

Trends and development

Until the mid-1990s, foam concrete was regarded as weak and non-durable with high shrinkage characteristics. This is due to the unstable foam bubbles resulted in foam concrete having properties unsuitable for producing very low density (Less than 300 kg/m dry density) as well as load bearing structural applications. It is therefore important to ensure that the air entrained into the foamed concrete is contained in stable, very tiny, uniform bubbles that remain intact and isolated, and do not thus increase the permeability of the cement paste between the voids.

The development of synthetic-enzyme based foaming agents, foam stability enhancing admixtures and specialised foam generating, mixing and pumping equipment has improved the stability of the foam and hence foam concrete, making it possible to manufacture as light as 75 kg/m density, a density that is just 7.5% of water. The enzyme consists of highly active proteins of biotechnological origin not based on protein hydrolysis. In recent years foamed concrete has been used extensively in highways, commercial buildings, disaster rehabilitation buildings, schools, apartments and housing developments in countries such as Germany, USA, Brazil, Singapore, India, Malaysia, Kuwait, Nigeria, Bangladesh, Botswana, Mexico, Indonesia, Libya, Saudi Arabia, Algeria, Iraq, Egypt and Vietnam.

Shock-absorption

Foamed concrete has been investigated for use as a bullet trap in high intensity US military firearm training ranges. This work resulted in the product SACON being fielded by the U.S. Army Corps of Engineers, which when worn out, can be shipped directly to metal recycling facilities without requiring the separation of the trapped bullets, as the calcium carbonate in the concrete acts as a flux.

The energy absorption capacity of foamed concrete was approximated from drop testing and found to vary from 4 to 15 MJ/m depending on its density. With optimum absorption estimated from a 1000 kg/m moderate density mix at water to cement (w/c) ratios from 0·6 to 0·7.

References

Concrete
Masonry